Richard Edward Wagner (born April 28, 1941) is an American economist. He is professor of economics at George Mason University. He works primarily in the fields of public finance and public choice.

Wagner received his doctorate in economics from the University of Virginia, studying under James M. Buchanan.  Wagner's work centers on the notion that macroeconomic phenomena are emergent, rather than being objects of choice.  In addition to Buchanan, major influences on his thought include Carl Menger and Thomas Schelling.

Selected publications
 The Fiscal Organization of American Federalism  (1971)
 "Revenue Structure, Fiscal Illusion, and Budgetary Choice" in Public Choice vol. 25, no. 1 (1976)
 "Institutional Constraints and Local Community Formation" in American Economic Review vol. 66, no. 2 (1976)
 Democracy in Deficit: The Political Legacy of Lord Keynes (co-authored with Buchanan) (1977)
 Public Finance: Revenues and Expenditures in a Democratic Society (1983)
 To Promote the General Welfare: Market Processes vs. Political Transfers (1989)
 The Economics of Smoking (co-authored with Robert Tollison) (1991)
 "Romance, Realism, and Economic Reform" (co-authored with Tollison) in Kyklos vol. 44, no. 1 (1991)
 Trade Protection in the United States (co-authored with Charles Rowley and Willem Thorbecke) (1995)
 Fiscal Sociology and the Theory of Public Finance (2007)

References

 Richard E. Wagner's CV at GMU

External links
 Richard E. Wagner, "Public Choice and the Diffusion of Classic Italian Public Finance"

Living people
21st-century American economists
George Mason University faculty
1941 births
University of Virginia alumni
American male non-fiction writers
Academic journal editors
Economists from North Dakota
20th-century American economists
21st-century American male writers
20th-century American male writers